Gate Mudaliyar Abraham Mendis Gunasekera (1869–1931) was a leading literary figure in Ceylon. He had served as an Interpreter Mudaliyar to the Registrar General of Ceylon. Gunasekera produced  a Sinhalese grammar as well as Sinhalese-English and English-Sinhalese dictionaries. He is the grandfather of the famous Sri Lankan construction engineer U.N. Gunasekera.

References

Sources
A. Mendis Gunasekera: "A Comprehensive Grammar of the Sinhalese Language", 1891 (first edition), reprinted 1962, Sri Lanka Sahitya Mandalaya Colombo.

1869 births
1931 deaths
Sinhalese writers
Grammarians from Sri Lanka
Sri Lankan lexicographers
Gate Mudaliyars